Arthur Edmund Easterbrook (November 4, 1893 – July 24, 1952) was an American aviator who started his career as a World War I flying ace credited with five aerial victories. During World War II, he held several important positions in the U. S. Army Air Corps.

Early life
Easterbrook came from a military family; his father was Major E. P. Easterbrook, of Fort Flagler, Washington. His sister Gladys Easterbrook [1894-1989] married General  J. Lawton Collins.

World War I
Easterbrook was commissioned as a second lieutenant on August 15, 1917. He served originally in 9 Squadron RAF as an observer in Royal Aircraft Factory FE.8s. He was reassigned to the American 1st Observation Squadron on August 20, 1918. Teamed with pilot William Portwood Ervin in a Salmson 2A2, Easterbrook scored his first aerial victory on October 6, 1918, a double victory on October 8, and his fourth on October 22, 1918. On November 4, 1918, he became one of the war's last aces.

World War II
During World War II, Easterbrook served on the staff of General H. H. Arnold. Easterbrook later commanded the Air Force's Western Training Command, as well as Santa Ana Air Base in California. On August 21, 1946, he retired as a brigadier general.

On January 21, 1950, he sustained serious injuries in a fall from an avocado tree. He was using a wheelchair and living in a Veterans Administration facility until his death by heart failure on July 24, 1952.

Honors and awards citations
Distinguished Service Cross

The Distinguished Service Cross is presented to Arthur Edmund Easterbrook, First Lieutenant (Air Service), U.S. Army, for extraordinary heroism in action near St. Mihiel, France, September 12, 1918. Because of intense aerial activity on the opening day of the St. Mihiel offensive, Lieutenant Easterbrook, observer, and Second Lieutenant Ralph E. De Castro, pilot, volunteered to fly over the enemy's lines on a photographic mission without the usual protection of accompanying planes. Notwithstanding the low-hanging clouds, which necessitated operation at an altitude of only 400 meters, they penetrated 4 kilometers beyond the German lines. Attacked by four enemy machines, they fought off their foes, completed their photographic mission, and returned safely.

Distinguished Service Cross (DSC) Oak Leaf Cluster

The Distinguished Service Cross is presented to Arthur Edmund Easterbrook, First Lieutenant (Air Service), U.S. Army, for extraordinary heroism in action near Exermont and Varennes, France, October 8, 1918. Lieutenant Easterbrook, with Lieutenant Erwin, pilot, successfully carried out a mission of locating our Infantry, despite five encounters with enemy planes. During these encounters he broke up a formation of three planes, sending one down out of control; killed or wounded an observer in an encounter with another formation; and sent a biplane crashing to the ground, besides driving away a formation of two planes and several single machines.

See also

 List of World War I flying aces from the United States

References

Bibliography
American Aces of World War 1 Harry Dempsey. Osprey Publishing, 2001. , .

External links
  USAF biography

Air Corps Tactical School alumni
1893 births
1952 deaths
United States Army Air Forces generals
Royal Air Force personnel of World War I
United States Army Air Service pilots of World War I
Recipients of the Distinguished Service Cross (United States)
Burials at Arlington National Cemetery
United States Army Air Forces generals of World War II
Military personnel from New York (state)